{{Infobox video game
|title          = To Preserve Quandic
|image          = to preserve quandic intro2.gif
|caption        = Title Screen
|developer      = Suspense Software
|publisher      = Prickly Pear Software
|designer       = David Karam<ref>AIGA Loop 2 - David Karam Variations: Designer, Programmer, Musician, Collaborator , dk7654321: Well I did one when I was 16. Got published as 'To Preserve Quandic'. You can find screen shots on Google. Then another 10 or so years ago. It was a golf game packaged with a holiday package of Chivas Regal.</ref>David Karam Probably Hates Your Web Site (Ours, Too), February 27, 1997, By Luanne Brown,  Microsoft  From Wayback Archive
|series         =
|engine         =
|released       = 1984
|genre          = Adventure game
|modes          = Single-player
|platforms      = TRS-80 Color Computer
}}To Preserve Quandic is a graphical adventure game written by David Karam for the TRS-80 Color Computer and published by Prickly Pear Software in 1984. Taking two full disks, it was larger than both The Sands of Egypt and The Dallas Quest'', which preceded it. The premise is to preserve the pacifistic Quandic race, who had advanced technology like time machines.

References

External links
To Preserve Quandic at Tandy Color Computer Games

Adventure games
1984 video games
TRS-80 Color Computer games
TRS-80 Color Computer-only games
Video games developed in the United States